ICAR-Central Institute of Freshwater Aquaculture (CIFA), formerly the Freshwater Aquaculture Research and Training Centre, is a research institute for freshwater aquaculture research and development in India, It is situated in Bhubaneswar, Odisha. It was founded in 1987 by the Indian Council of Agricultural Research (ICAR), New Delhi. Its genesis lies in the Pond Culture Division of Central Inland Fisheries Research Institute (CIFRI), Cuttack which started the training center at Kausalyaganga, on the outskirts of Bhubaneswar for Developing and Training on Inland Fishery.

References

External links
 Official Website

Aquaculture in India
Research institutes in Bhubaneswar
Indian Council of Agricultural Research
Universities and colleges in Bhubaneswar
Research institutes established in 1987
1987 establishments in Orissa